Casa Grande Municipal Airport  is a city-owned public-use airport  north of Casa Grande in Pinal County, Arizona. The FAA's National Plan of Integrated Airport Systems for 2009–2013 categorizes it as a general aviation facility. The airport is not served by an airline.

Facilities
It has one runway: 5/23 measures 5,200 by 100 feet (1,585 x 30 m) and is made of asphalt

In the year ending April 3, 2020 the airport had an average of 334 aircraft operations per day: 98% general aviation, 2% air taxi, and <1% military.

74 aircraft are based at this airport: 63 single-engine, 5 multi-engine, 5 helicopter, and 1 ultralight.

Incidents
 A man died after walking into the spinning propeller of his Cessna 172SP,  which was on a taxiway at Casa Grande, on January 18, 2005. The pilot was preparing to fly the aircraft to the Stellar Airpark as part of a ferry operation.
 On February 6, 2013, a twin engine Beechcraft King Air crashed at Casa Grande at 11:45 a.m. Two people were on board; both died. The post-crash investigation found no anomalies that would have prevented normal operation in either the airframe or the engine; investigations to the propeller also found that the engines were operating at the time of impact. The probable cause of the accident was found to be loss of control after the pilot excessively pitched up on a go-around attempt, resulting in a fatal stall/spin 300 feet above the ground.
 A man survived a small plane crash at Casa Grande Airport on November 27, 2018. He received minor facial injuries and was flown to Phoenix for medical treatment.

References

External links 
 Airport page at City of Casa Grande website
 Casa Grande Municipal Airport (CGZ) at Arizona DOT airport directory
 Aerial image as of 1 October 1996 from USGS The National Map\
 

Airports in Pinal County, Arizona
Buildings and structures in Casa Grande, Arizona